The Canton of Poligny is a canton within the department of Jura in the French region of Bourgogne-Franche-Comté.

Composition 

Since the French canton reorganisation which came into effect in March 2015, the communes of the canton of Poligny are:

Baume-les-Messieurs
Besain
Blois-sur-Seille
Blye
Bonnefontaine
Briod
Buvilly
Chamole
Château-Chalon
Châtillon
Chaussenans
Conliège
Domblans
Fay-en-Montagne
Le Fied
Frontenay
Hauteroche
Ladoye-sur-Seille
Lavigny
Le Louverot
La Marre
Menétru-le-Vignoble
Molain
Montaigu
Montain
Nevy-sur-Seille
Nogna
Pannessières
Perrigny
Picarreau
Le Pin
Plainoiseau
Poids-de-Fiole
Poligny
Publy
Revigny
Saint-Maur
Vaux-sur-Poligny
Verges
Le Vernois
Vevy
Voiteur

References

Cantons of Jura (department)